Miss Earth 2023 will be the 23rd Miss Earth pageant to be held in 2023 in Nha Trang, Khánh Hòa, Vietnam. Mina Sue Choi of South Korea will crown her successor at the end of the event.

Background

Date and location
On July 18, 2022, it was announced by the Miss Earth Organization that the 23rd Miss Earth pageant will be held in Vietnam.

Contestants
As of 19 March 2023, 11 contestants have been confirmed.

Upcoming pageants

Notes

References

External links
 Miss Earth Official Website

2023 in Vietnam
2023
Earth 2023